Sankranthi (The Tender Trap) is a 2007 Sri Lankan Sinhala drama film directed by Anuruddha Jayasinghe and co-produced by Prof. Nimal Senanayake and Dr. Withana P. Somasiri for N.S Productions. It stars Sangeetha Weeraratne, W. Jayasiri and Bimal Jayakody in lead roles along with Giriraj Kaushalya and Sunil Hettiarachchi. Music composed by Navaratne Gamage. The film was screened at 34th International Indian Film Festival in World Cinema category and also won numerous awards at film festivals. It is the 1165th Sri Lankan film in the Sinhala cinema.

The film was screened at the 34th International Indian Film Festival in December 2006.

Plot

Cast
 Sangeetha Weeraratne as Pam
 W. Jayasiri as Dr. Gerad
 Bimal Jayakody as Sunimal
 Giriraj Kaushalya
 Sunil Hettiarachchi
 Hemasiri Liyanage
 Seetha Kumari

References

2007 films
2000s Sinhala-language films